David Rose is a former club secretary of Ipswich Town F.C.  He started his career at the club aged 15 under Alf Ramsey, before becoming secretary of the club in 1958.  He retired in 2003, and was made an honorary vice-president of the club in 2006. In 2004, he received a UEFA Order of Merit.

Rose served on the board of the Suffolk County Football Association until 2015 when he stepped down.  He sat on commissions for The Football Association.

Along with former players Chris Kiwomya and Steve McCall, Rose was inducted into the Ipswich Town F.C. Hall of Fame in March 2017 for his service to the club.

References

1940s births
Living people
Ipswich Town F.C. non-playing staff